The Front for the Liberation of Champa (abbreviated FLC) was a Cham nationalist organisation active in Ninh Thuan province and the Central Highlands of Vietnam. It was founded in 1962 and merged with the Central Highlands Liberation Front and the Liberation Front of Kampuchea Krom to form the United Front for the Liberation of Oppressed Races (FULRO) in 1964.

References 

1962 establishments in Vietnam
1964 disestablishments in Vietnam
Political organizations based in Vietnam
National liberation movements
Military units and formations established in 1962
Islam in Vietnam
Cham